Siri Tuttle is the former director of the Alaska Native Language Center, the Alaska Native Language Archive, and a former Associate Professor of Linguistics  at the University of Alaska, Fairbanks. She specializes in Dene (Athabascan) languages of interior Alaska and has contributed to the fields of acoustic phonetics, phonology, and morphology. She retired in 2021.

Biography
Tuttle started working an Associate Professor of Linguistics at the Alaska Native Language Center at the University of Alaska Fairbanks in 2003. She specializes in Dene (Athabascan) languages of interior Alaska and has contributed to the fields of acoustic phonetics, phonology, and morphology. In 2016, Tuttle was named director of the Alaska Native Language Archive.

Research 
Tuttle is active in Lower Tanana language revitalization efforts, and has published reference materials such as the Benhti Kokht’ana Kenaga’: Lower Tanana Pocket Dictionary. She is well known for her documentary and descriptive language work in Lower Tanana and Ahtna, and has also conducted linguistic fieldwork in New Mexico, California, and Arizona.

Publications 
(2009) Tuttle, Siri. Ahtna Athabascan Grammar Reference. Chistochina: Mount Sanford Tribal Consortium.
(2009) Tuttle, Siri. Benhti Kokht’ana Kenaga’: Lower Tanana Pocket Dictionary. Fairbanks: Alaska Native Language Center. 
(1997). Hargus, Sharon and Siri Tuttle. "Augmentation as Affixation in Athabaskan Languages". Phonology 14:2, 177-220.

References

External links 
 Curriculum Vitae
 Sustainable Heritage Network: Language Work and Language Collections

Linguists of Na-Dene languages
University of Alaska Fairbanks faculty
Linguists from the United States
Women linguists
Living people
Year of birth missing (living people)